Silene virginica, the fire pink, is a wildflower in the pink family, Caryophyllaceae. It is known for its distinct brilliant red flowers. Fire pink begins blooming in late spring and continuing throughout the summer. It is sometimes grown in wildflower, shade, and rock gardens.

Description
S. virginica is a small, ( tall, short-lived perennial (2–3 years), with lance shaped leaves. Its stems, and the bases of the flowers, are covered in short sticky hairs. Each flower is approximately five centimeters in diameter and composed of five notched, brilliant red petals which extend into a long tube.

Distribution and habitat
Fire pink grows in open woods and rocky deciduous slopes in central and eastern North America, from Texas to the west, Florida to the south, New York to the east, and ranging as far north as extreme southern Ontario. It is protected as a state endangered species in Wisconsin, Florida, and Michigan. It is imperiled in Louisiana.

Ecology
Fire pink's principal pollinator is the ruby-throated hummingbird (Archilochus colubris), which is attracted by the flowers' bright red petals and sugary nectar.

Varieties
There are two recognized varieties of fire pink. Most plants of this species are classified as Silene virginica var. virginica, however an endemic variety occurs in West Virginia called Silene virginica var. robusta.

References

virginica
Flora of North America
Plants described in 1753
Taxa named by Carl Linnaeus